Mary Theresa McKee Waggaman, was an American author of Catholic literature in the early 20th century who was primarily known for writing short stories for children.

Biography 
Waggaman was born on September 21, 1846 to John and Ester (Cottrell) McKee. She was from Baltimore and attended Mount de Sales Academy in Catonsville, Maryland. Her mother died when she was young, and she moved with her father to New York during the American Civil War. Her father was arrested because of his support for the American South, and Waggaman would write "An American Bastile" about her experiences during the Civil War that was published in Ave Maria. After the Civil War she returned to Mount de Sales Academy and was valedictorian of her class in 1864.

As early as 1871 Waggaman was a published writer, starting with a poem in the January 1972 issue of Harper's Magazine. Waggaman's first short story was "Little Comrades" which she wrote to impress upon her first son the importance of his First Communion. While Waggaman initially did not share that she received funds for her writing, she eventually described how she was able to earn enough money from her writing to hire a nurse and servants who enabled her to write each day. 

Waggaman is known for her writings for children and her writing for Catholic periodicals. She published under different names, using "Fannie Fairie" for serials and "Queerquill" for poems.

Selected publications 

 

Grapes of Thorns

Awards and honors 
In 1923 Waggaman won first prize for a story she submitted to the Columbian magazine published by the Knights of Columbus. There were 3,000 authors competing for this honor.

Personal life 
Waggaman married Samuel J. Waggaman in 1870. Together they had eleven children, six of whom were alive upon her death in 1931. One daughter, also named Mary T. Waggaman, achieved recognition as a poet. In 1942, her daughter Ester W. Neill, who was also a writer, wrote about her mother in The Book Of Catholic Authors First Series.

References

Further reading

1846 births
1931 deaths
American women writers
American children's writers